Gamaksan, also known as Kamak Mountain or Hill 675 during the Korean War, is a mountain in Gyeonggi-do, South Korea. Its sits between the cities of Paju, Yangju and Yeoncheon County.

It has been one of the sacred mountains of shamanism since the Silla Dynasty. According to the Annals of King Taejo, during the Joseon Dynasty, the royal court held a byeolgieun on this mountain in spring and autumn. In the middle of the mountain, there was Gamaksa Temple, now demolished. Since the Three Kingdoms period it has been a battleground: Battles were fought here during the Khitan invasion, and it was also the main battlefield of the Battle of Gorangpo during the Korean War. Being on the border of the demilitarised zone (DMZ) there continue to be military bases closeby.

See also
 List of mountains in Korea

Notes

References 

 

Mountains of Gyeonggi Province
Paju
Yangju
Yeoncheon County
Mountains of South Korea